Conus gonsalensis is a species of sea snail, a marine gastropod mollusc in the family Conidae, the cone snails, cone shells or cones.

These snails are predatory and venomous. They are capable of "stinging" humans.

Description
The size of the shell attains 11 mm.

Distribution
This marine species occurs in the Atlantic Ocean off Maio Island, Cape Verde.

References

 Cossignani T. & Fiadeiro R. (2014). Cinque nuovi coni da Capo Verde. Malacologia Mostra Mondiale. 84: 21- 27 page(s): 25

External links
 World Register of Marine Species
 

gonsalensis
Gastropods described in 2014
Fauna of Maio, Cape Verde
Gastropods of Cape Verde